Khubau was an ancient Egyptian high official who lived at the end of the Old Kingdom in the 6th Dynasty around 2300 BC. He might date under king Pepi II (about 2284 BC – 2247 BC) or shortly after. Khubau is known from his tomb at Saqqara close to the Pyramid of Pepi II. His proper tomb was found by Gaston Maspero further elements, including two small obelisks and a small stela were excavated by Gustave Jéquier

Khubau had several titles. He was priest at the pyramid of Pepi II, overseer of priests but also overlord of Ta-wer. With the latter position he was nomarch in the 8th Upper Egyptian nome  

His tomb consist of a shaft with a decorated burial chamber, showing offerings.

References 

Nomarchs
People of the Sixth Dynasty of Egypt